Nields may refer to:

Nields (surname)
The Nields, musical group including Katryna Nields and Nerissa Nields
USS Nields (DD-616), Benson-class destroyer in the United States Navy during World War II

See also
Nield
Niels